Alan Aisenberg (born March 18, 1993) is an American actor and television producer. He is best known for his role as Baxter Bayley on the Netflix original series Orange Is the New Black.

Life and career
Aisenberg was raised in Englewood Cliffs, New Jersey and picked up acting at a Jewish Community Center in Tenafly, New Jersey at a very young age. While attending college at the New York University's Tisch School of the Arts, he co-founded a production company known as Deverge.

Aisenberg made his screen debut in the 2007 horror film Unholy. He later made his television debut in 2008 with a minor role in the Nickelodeon series The Naked Brothers Band before landing roles in a number of films, as well as television series such as Mozart in the Jungle and Inside Amy Schumer. In June 2015, Aisenberg began his recurring role as correctional officer Baxter "Gerber" Bayley on the Netflix comedy-drama series Orange Is the New Black.

On January 29, 2017, Aisenberg and the rest of the cast of Orange Is the New Black won a Screen Actors Guild Award for Outstanding Performance by an Ensemble in a Comedy Series. In October 2017, it was announced that Pop ordered a pilot for Sebastian Wakes Up, an improv comedy series co-created by Aisenberg and produced by Deverge, Aisenberg's production company. Aisenberg co-starred in Second Act, a comedy which was released on December 21, 2018.

Filmography

Actor

Film

Television

Producer

References

External links

1993 births
Living people
American people of Argentine-Jewish descent
Jewish American male actors
21st-century American male actors
American male child actors
American male film actors
American male television actors
Male actors from New Jersey
People from Englewood Cliffs, New Jersey
Tisch School of the Arts alumni
Television producers from New Jersey